The 2017 Belo PSL Invitational Cup was the first indoor volleyball tournament for the Philippine Super Liga's fifth season. It began on March 4, 2017 and ended April 1, 2017. The tournament adopted the all-to-play format to give playing time to every player in each team. The guest team, Kobe Shinwa Women's University, were the tournament champions; and the Cignal HD Spikers were the co-champions.

Teams

Classification round

|}

|}

Final round

6th to 4th place

|}

|}

Finals

|}

|}

Final standing

Individual awards

Venues
Filoil Flying V Arena (main venue)
Malolos Sports and Convention Center, Malolos, Bulacan
Muntinlupa Sports Complex, Muntinlupa

Broadcast partners
Sports5: TV5, AksyonTV, Hyper (SD and HD), Sports5.ph

References

External links
PSL website

Philippine Super Liga
PSL
PSL